Jun Tanaka may refer to:

 Jun Tanaka (poet) (1890–1966), poet in Showa period Japan
 Jun Tanaka (footballer) (born 1983), Japanese football player
 Jun Tanaka (chef), American-born British Japanese television chef